Casola may refer to:

 Casola di Napoli, municipality in the Metropolitan City of Naples in the Italian region Campania
 Casola in Lunigiana, municipality in the Province of Massa and Carrara in the Italian region Tuscany
 Casola Valsenio, municipality in the Province of Ravenna in the Italian region Emilia-Romagna

See also 

 Casole (disambiguation)
 Cassola (disambiguation)